Babamunida is a genus of squat lobsters in the family Munididae, containing the following species:
 Babamunida brucei (Baba, 1974)
 Babamunida callista (Macpherson, 1994)
 Babamunida debrae Baba, 2011
 Babamunida hystrix (Macpherson & de Saint Laurent, 1991)
 Babamunida javieri (Macpherson, 1994)
 Babamunida kanaloa Schnabel et al., 2009
 Babamunida plexaura (Macpherson & de Saint Laurent, 1991)

References

External links

Squat lobsters